Mint Royale is the alias of electronic music producer Neil Claxton and, until 2004, a duo consisting of himself and Chris Baker, originating from Manchester, England. It was founded by Claxton and Baker in 1997. Baker left the band in 2004, but Claxton continued to produce music under the pseudonym "Mint Royale" until 2016. In 2020, Claxton returned to releasing music under the Mint Royale name.

Career

1997–2001: Early success and first album 
Mint Royale first specialised in remixes, and became known after the release of their mix of "Tequila" by Terrorvision was a number 2 hit in the charts. They were championed by big beat pioneer Norman Cook, aka Fatboy Slim, whose DJ sets regularly included their songs. Their sound was similar to his, to the extent that some people mistakenly believed Mint Royale to be a pseudonym for Cook himself. Their first album, On the Ropes, was released in late 1999, and achieved recognition. The single "Don't Falter", featuring Lauren Laverne from Kenickie, was a Top 20 hit in the British charts. The song "From Rusholme with Love" has been made recognisable through its extensive use in film and television series soundtracks. Predating Mint Royale, the original version - Joe Harriott-John Mayer Double Quintet composed - was entitled 'Acka Raga' and the theme tune to early editions of BBCtv's family quiz, 'Ask the Family' (1967). Besides its use as the theme tune for the film Kung Pow! Enter The Fist, it appears on the soundtracks of the films Vanilla Sky, Get Carter, and Serendipity, and the television series Alias (episode "The Prophecy") and Spaced. The song "Because I'm Worth It" has also been used as the theme for the Jamie Theakston and Zoë Ball chat show The Priory. The song "Show Me", which first appeared on the 2001 US reissue of the album, is played every Friday by John Richards of KEXP and the song has become known as "The Friday Song". "Show Me" was also used in the National Lampoon film Van Wilder.

2002–2004: Continued success and second album 
The band released its second album, Dancehall Places, in 2002. The first single from this album, "Sexiest Man in Jamaica", featuring a sample of a Prince Buster song, became their second UK Top 20 hit. As the band embarked on a series of live shows and a UK tour in 2003, a new single was released, "Blue Song," the video for which featured comedians Noel Fielding and Julian Barratt, of The Mighty Boosh fame, as well as Nick Frost of Spaced and Shaun of the Dead fame and Michael Smiley, also of Spaced. The video was directed by Edgar Wright, and was the main inspiration for his 2017 film Baby Driver.

For DJ sets and live performances the band invited Fallowfield based DJ Fidroc, known for his work with the Egerton Kru, to the group.

2004–2008: "Singin' in the Rain" and third album 
Mint Royale returned to the studio to start writing and recording their third album in April 2004. The next few months were a turbulent time for Mint Royale with founding member Chris Baker leaving the band. However, Neil and the resident vocalists & musicians returned to the studio to complete the recording of the third album in January 2005 and the result was See You In The Morning with the then-unknown Duffy singing on two of the album's songs. In 2005 the group released "Waiting in the Rain" on the Wait for You EP — an extended version of Scanners remix of "Singin' in the Rain", which was featured in the  Volkswagen Golf GTI commercial from 2005. It reached number 20 on the UK Singles Chart after it was released as a single (remixed and renamed as "Singing In the Rain"). This version also features on the album See You in the Morning.

In 2007, Mint Royale released a compilation CD+DVD named Pop Is..., which contained all their singles and videos, as well as a couple of the remixes they had done for other performers, and a new song, "Wham-Bar," based on the Wham! hit song "Wham Rap! (Enjoy What You Do)". The same year, Mint Royale released a bonus track remix of Frank Sinatra's "This Town" on the Ocean's Thirteen official soundtrack.

On 1 June 2008, "Singin' in the Rain" re-entered the UK Singles Chart at number 28 after the success of George Sampson on Britain's Got Talent and Jack Chambers on So You Think You Can Dance Australia. It then became number 1 on the UK Chart announced on 8 June 2008.

2013–2016: Later years and hiatus 
On 10 May 2013, Mint Royale released the GTFU EP on iTunes.

On 31 December 2014, Mint Royale released "Ring", featuring a spoken word sample by Willem Dafoe.

On 9 March 2016, the end of Mint Royale was announced. The final single, "Time", was released on 10 March 2016. The @MintRoyale Twitter account was changed from "Mint Royale" to "Neil Claxton" on 29 April 2016, after a few "goodbye" messages.

On 21 June 2019, Seattle-based radio station KEXP played a specially requested extended version from Mint Royale of the song "Show Me" on The Morning Show with John Richards for the station's "Long Songs on the Longest Day of the Year". The song is known for the station as, "The Friday Song".

2020–present: Return 
On 7 February 2020, Mint Royale released a new song entitled "Glitter" with a music video produced by Neil Claxton.

Discography

Albums
On the Ropes (1999)
Dancehall Places (2002) UK #171
See You in the Morning (2005)

Singles

References

External links
Mint Royale website

Big beat groups
English electronic musicians
English house musicians
English record producers
Male musical duos
Trip hop groups
Musical groups from Manchester
Remixers